Yairipok is a town in Thoubal district in the Indian state of Manipur.

Geography
The Thoubal river passes through the heart of the town. Yairipok has about 120 towns and villages. Communities such as viz-metei, metei pangal, naga, kuki live there. Tulihal is the most educated area in Yairipok.

Agriculture
The most fertile and advanced crop field "Salom Loukon" is located in Yairipok. This agricultural land is famous throughout the state and is well known for its unique quality. Every year, where most parts of the state faces drought or flood, this paddy field stays normal. This is because of the irrigation canal from the Thoubal multipurpose project in the Thoubal river. Fish farms and vegetables are the main outputs. Poirou pat loukon also produces food crops.

Tourism

Yairipok is famous for the Yairipok Thambalnu, a lady who sacrificed her life to save the lives of people from the flood. and an epic based on her life was written about by Mathurabashimayum Nandakishor Sharma in 1966.

Yairipok has many tourist events, including festivals, rituals, harvest, landscapes, people and special events.

Temples 
Kaina is the village where Hinduism was introduced in Manipur. The Kaina temple is notable because the idols in the govindaji temple in Imphal are made from jackfruit.

Kwarok Sarang Laisaba/Nongpok Ningthou is a holy place known for its blessings of lord Sarang Laisaba/Nongpok Ningthou is the Kwarok Sarang Laisaba/Nongpok Ningthou. This place is in Kekru. It is believed that the blessings from the temple have effect. Many visitors go to see it on the top of a hill. Hindu people call it Kwarok Mahadev. They pray on 5th Panchami.

Pineapple Festival

The Andro community celebrates a pineapple festival, one of Manipur's biggest occasions. A hut made of pineapple draws tourists. The aim of the festival is to promote the pineapple products of Yairipok.

Andro

Andro is another tourist spot in Manipur. It is known for its ancient museum where tools of human civilization were found.

Leirongthel Pitra 
Leirongthel Pitra is a small nearby village in Thoubal district. Cultivation and seasonal jobs are the main occupations. Recent press reports concern sand mining restrictions.

Sports Festival 
In 2017 came the 13th Annual Sports Festival.

Demographics 
Its population reached around 9,569 people as of 2011 census.

 India census, Yairipok had a population of 8263. Males constituted 51% of the population and females 49%. The average literacy rate was 64%, higher than the national average of 59.5%: male literacy was 74%, and female literacy was 54%. 14% of the population was under 6. The population density was 1,196/km² [2011] , growing at 1.48%/year [2001 → 2011].

References

Cities and towns in Thoubal district
Thoubal